Gary John Mavers (born 1 September 1964), is an English television actor.

Mavers graduated from the Royal Academy of Dramatic Art, and is best known for his portrayals of GP Andrew Attwood in Peak Practice which he worked on for 5 years as a hardworking doctor in a country practice, (1995 – 2000), and Will Manning in Casualty in a year long role, (2004 – 2005).

Mavers took over the role of Gordon Livesy in Emmerdale from 2015 to 2016 where his character was involved in a child abuse storyline, after it was revealed Gordon abused his son Aaron Livesy (played by Danny Miller) as a child. Mavers was said to have "the hardest job on TV" by many and was congratulated for both his sinister portrayal of the character and being willing to take on the controversial role.

Mavers has three daughters, including fellow actress Abby Mavers, and is also the younger brother of The La's frontman Lee Mavers.

Filmography

References

External links
 

1964 births
Living people
Male actors from Liverpool
20th-century English male actors
21st-century English male actors
English male television actors
People from Huyton